Tetramerista is a genus of flowering plants belonging to the family Tetrameristaceae.

Its native range is Borneo and Malaya.

Species:

Tetramerista glabra

References

Ericales
Ericales genera